The Gridiron Classic, also known as the Rotary Gridiron Classic presented by Tyco and later The Villages Gridiron Classic for sponsorship reasons, was a post-season college football all-star game played each January in Florida from 1999 through 2005.

From 1999 to 2003, it featured a team representing Florida versus a team from the rest of the United States; it was played at the Citrus Bowl in Orlando. During the two years at The Villages, the game used a North vs. South format.

On August 19, 2005, game organizers Florida Citrus Sports canceled the 2006 playing of the Gridiron Classic, after failing to find a sponsor once The Villages decided not to renew the annual game at their facility. The game has not resumed since.

Game results

 All-time series: Team Florida over Team USA (3–2); North and South tied (1–1).

MVPs

See also
List of college bowl games

References

External links
 

College football all-star games
American football in Florida